Danny McAlinden (1 June 1947 – 8 March 2021) was a heavyweight boxer from Northern Ireland who was British and Commonwealth champion in 1972 when he defeated Jack Bodell in two rounds at the Aston Villa football ground. McAlinden nick named "Dangerous Dan" was managed by George Middleton. Middleton had led Randolph Turpin to the World Middleweight Championship in 1951.

McAlinden was born in Newry at the age of 15 he moved to Coventry. In 1966 McAlinden represented Northern Ireland at the Kingston British Empire and Commonwealth Games winning a bronze medal in the heavyweight division. In 1967 he fought at the European Championship in Rome.    He turned professional in 1969 and in his second professional fight, he stopped the future British champion Richard Dunn. On the program of the  Joe Frazier versus Muhammad Ali I bout on March 8, 1971, at the Madison Square Garden in New York, New York, United States, McAlinden outpointed Ali's brother, Rahman, who was undefeated in seven previous fights, in a contest of prospects, by decision after six rounds. He was at one time considered a potential opponent for the world champion George Foreman's first title defence. However, his form dipped and in 1973 he began to lose fights, eventually losing his title in 1975 to Bunny Johnson in nine rounds. He attempted to win back the title in 1975 when the holder was Richard Dunn, but he lost in round two. He fought on until 1981 and after refusing to face the explosive punching David Pearce he decided to retire.  In total he had 45 fights with a 31–12–2 record, winning 28 by knockout.

In 2010 it was reported that he was suffering from cancer of the tongue.

Professional boxing record

|-
|align="center" colspan=8|31 Wins (28 knockouts, 3 decisions), 12 Losses (8 knockouts, 4 decisions), 2 Draws 
|-
| align="center" style="border-style: none none solid solid; background: #e3e3e3"|Result
| align="center" style="border-style: none none solid solid; background: #e3e3e3"|Record
| align="center" style="border-style: none none solid solid; background: #e3e3e3"|Opponent
| align="center" style="border-style: none none solid solid; background: #e3e3e3"|Type
| align="center" style="border-style: none none solid solid; background: #e3e3e3"|Round
| align="center" style="border-style: none none solid solid; background: #e3e3e3"|Date
| align="center" style="border-style: none none solid solid; background: #e3e3e3"|Location
| align="center" style="border-style: none none solid solid; background: #e3e3e3"|Notes
|-align=center
|Loss
|
|align=left| Denton Ruddock
|TKO
|5
|30 March 1981
|align=left|Aston Villa Leisure Centre, Birmingham
|align=left|
|-
|Loss
|
|align=left| Tony Moore
|PTS
|8
|14 December 1980
|align=left|Burlington Hotel, Dublin
|align=left|
|-
|Win
|
|align=left| David Fry
|TKO
|6
|22 September 1980
|align=left|Maysfield Leisure Centre, Belfast
|align=left|
|-
|Loss
|
|align=left| George Scott
|PTS
|8
|20 November 1979
|align=left|Maysfield Leisure Centre, Belfast
|align=left|
|-
|Loss
|
|align=left| Tommy Kiely
|TKO
|6
|22 May 1978
|align=left|Grosvenor House, Mayfair, London
|align=left|
|-
|Loss
|
|align=left| Neil Malpass
|TKO
|3
|19 September 1977
|align=left|Grosvenor House, Mayfair, London
|align=left|
|-
|Win
|
|align=left| Sean McKenna
|TKO
|2
|26 July 1977
|align=left|Templemore Sports Complex, Derry
|align=left|
|-
|Win
|
|align=left| Terry O'Connor
|TKO
|1
|7 April 1977
|align=left|Dudley Town Hall, Dudley
|align=left|
|-
|Loss
|
|align=left| Tony Moore
|TKO
|4
|30 November 1976
|align=left|Dudley Civic Hall, Dudley
|align=left|
|-
|Win
|
|align=left| Eddie Fenton
|TKO
|4
|14 July 1976
|align=left|Wolverhampton
|align=left|
|-
|Loss
|
|align=left| Richard Dunn
|KO
|2
|4 November 1975
|align=left|Empire Pool, Wembley, London
|align=left|
|-
|Win
|
|align=left| Rodell Dupree
|KO
|3
|14 October 1975
|align=left|Royal Albert Hall, Kensington, London
|align=left|
|-
|Win
|
|align=left| Hartmut Sasse
|KO
|5
|3 June 1975
|align=left|Royal Albert Hall, Kensington, London
|align=left|
|-
|Win
|
|align=left| Richie Yates
|KO
|3
|29 April 1975
|align=left|Royal Albert Hall, Kensington, London
|align=left|
|-
|Loss
|
|align=left| Bunny Johnson
|KO
|9
|13 January 1975
|align=left|Grosvenor House, Mayfair, London
|align=left|
|-
|Loss
|
|align=left| Pat Duncan
|PTS
|10
|15 January 1974
|align=left|Royal Albert Hall, Kensington, London
|align=left|
|-
|Win
|
|align=left| Vernon McIntosh
|KO
|4
|11 December 1973
|align=left|Royal Albert Hall, Kensington, London
|align=left|
|-
|Win
|
|align=left| Tony Ventura
|TKO
|1
|13 November 1973
|align=left|Empire Pool, Wembley, London
|align=left|
|-
|Loss
|
|align=left| Morris Jackson
|TKO
|3
|14 May 1973
|align=left|Grosvenor House, Mayfair, London
|align=left|
|-
|Win
|
|align=left| Willie Moore
|KO
|5
|12 December 1972
|align=left|Villa Park, Birmingham
|align=left|
|-
|Win
|
|align=left| Jack Bodell
|KO
|2
|27 June 1972
|align=left|Villa Park, Birmingham
|align=left|
|-
|Loss
|
|align=left| Larry Middleton
|TKO
|8
|13 March 1972
|align=left|King's Hall, Manchester
|align=left|
|-
|Win
|
|align=left| Chuck Olivera
|KO
|7
|9 December 1971
|align=left|Wolverhampton Civic Hall, Wolverhampton
|align=left|
|-
|Win
|
|align=left| Dick Gosha
|TKO
|9
|8 November 1971
|align=left|Mayfair, London
|align=left|
|-
|Win
|
|align=left| Bill Drover
|KO
|4
|13 September 1971
|align=left|Mayfair, London
|align=left|
|-
|Win
|
|align=left| Roberto Davila
|TKO
|5
|9 June 1971
|align=left|Cliffs Pavilion, Southend
|align=left|
|-
|Win
|
|align=left| Carl Gizzi
|PTS
|10
|28 April 1971
|align=left|Solihull Civic Hall, Solihull
|align=left|
|-
|Win
|
|align=left| Rahman Ali
|PTS
|6
|8 March 1971
|align=left|Madison Square Garden, New York City
|align=left|
|-
|Draw
|
|align=left| Tommy Hicks
|PTS
|10
|24 February 1971
|align=left|Mayfair Sporting Club, Mayfair, London
|align=left|
|-
|Win
|
|align=left| Lou Bailey
|PTS
|8
|19 January 1971
|align=left|Ulster Hall, Belfast
|align=left|
|-
|Draw
|
|align=left| Ray Patterson
|PTS
|10
|3 December 1970
|align=left|Wolverhampton Civic Hall, Wolverhampton
|align=left|
|-
|Win
|
|align=left| Tommy Hicks
|TKO
|7
|12 November 1970
|align=left|Southend
|align=left|
|-
|Win
|
|align=left| Moses Harrell
|TKO
|1
|12 October 1970
|align=left|Mayfair Sporting Club, Mayfair, London
|align=left|
|-
|Loss
|
|align=left| Jack O'Halloran
|PTS
|8
|6 July 1970
|align=left|Mayfair Sporting Club, Mayfair, London,
|align=left|
|-
|Win
|
|align=left| JD McCauley
|KO
|1
|19 May 1970
|align=left|Cliffs Pavilion, Southend
|align=left|
|-
|Win
|
|align=left| Edmund Stewart
|TKO
|2
|27 April 1970
|align=left|Mayfair, London,
|align=left|
|-
|Win
|
|align=left| Sylvester Dullaire
|KO
|4
|17 March 1970
|align=left|Wolverhampton
|align=left|
|-
|Win
|
|align=left| Billy Wynter
|TKO
|3
|5 March 1970
|align=left|Cliffs Pavilion, Southend
|align=left|
|-
|Win
|
|align=left| Tommy Clark
|TKO
|5
|23 February 1970
|align=left|Grosvenor House, Mayfair, London,
|align=left|
|-
|Win
|
|align=left| Henri Ferjules
|KO
|2
|12 January 1970
|align=left|Mayfair Sporting Club, Mayfair, London,
|align=left|
|-
|Win
|
|align=left| Phil Smith
|TKO
|3
|17 November 1969
|align=left|Great International Sporting Club, Nottingham
|align=left|
|-
|Win
|
|align=left| Obe Hepburn
|TKO
|4
|15 September 1969
|align=left|Mayfair Sporting Club, Mayfair, London
|align=left|
|-
|Win
|
|align=left| Dennis Avoth
|TKO
|1
|7 July 1969
|align=left|Mayfair, London
|align=left|
|-
|Win
|
|align=left| John Cullen
|TKO
|2
|7 July 1969
|align=left|Mayfair, London
|align=left|
|-
|Win
|
|align=left| Richard Dunn
|KO
|1
|7 July 1969
|align=left|Mayfair, London
|align=left|
|}

References

1947 births
Heavyweight boxers
2021 deaths
Sportspeople from Newry
Male boxers from Northern Ireland
Boxers at the 1966 British Empire and Commonwealth Games
Commonwealth Games bronze medallists for Northern Ireland
Irish male boxers
Commonwealth Games medallists in boxing
Medallists at the 1966 British Empire and Commonwealth Games